Gaios "Guy" Skordilis (born December 6, 1987) is a Greek professional basketball player who plays for Úrvalsdeild karla club Grindvík. He is a 2.08 m (6'10") tall 125 kg (275 lb.) center.

Professional career
After playing with the youth teams of Faiakes Corfu and Iraklis, Skordilis began his professional career in 2006, with the Greek League club Aris Thessaloniki. In 2011, he moved to the Greek League club Ikaros Kallitheas. In 2012, he moved to the six-time EuroLeague champions, Panathinaikos.

He joined Panionios in 2013, and he moved to Apollon Patras in 2014. In 2015, Skordilis signed a 2-year contract with the emerging powerhouse, Faros Keratsiniou, of the Greek A2 League.

Skordilis moved to Peristeri in 2017. On July 14, 2019, he renewed his contract with the club through 2021. After temporarily deciding to split ways, Skordilis and the Athenian club renewed their contract on July 8, 2020. On July 30, 2021, he officially parted ways with the club after four seasons. 

On August 17, 2021, Skordilis signed with Iraklis. In 16 games, he averaged 7.2 points and 5.5 rebounds in under 18 minutes per contest. He left the team just before the end of the season and moved to the Canadian club Montreal Alliance. On June 14, 2022, Skordilis left the team to return to Greece ahead of the birth of a child.

In August 2022, Skordilis signed with Úrvalsdeild karla club Grindvík.

National team career
With the junior national team of Greece, Skordilis played at the 2005 FIBA Europe Under-18 Championship. He also won the silver medal at the 2009 Mediterranean Games, while playing for the Greek under-26 national team.

Awards and accomplishments
Greek Cup Winner: (2013)
Greek League Champion: (2013)

References

External links
Euroleague.net Profile
FIBA.com Profile
FIBA Europe Profile
Eurobasket.com Profile
Greek Basket League Profile 
Hellenic Basketball Federation Profile 

1987 births
Living people
Apollon Patras B.C. players
Aris B.C. players
Centers (basketball)
Competitors at the 2009 Mediterranean Games
Faros Keratsiniou B.C. players
Iraklis Thessaloniki B.C. players
Greek Basket League players
Greek expatriate basketball people in Canada
Greek men's basketball players
Grindavík men's basketball players
Ikaros B.C. players
Mediterranean Games medalists in basketball
Mediterranean Games silver medalists for Greece
Montreal Alliance players
Panathinaikos B.C. players
Panionios B.C. players
Peristeri B.C. players
Úrvalsdeild karla (basketball) players
Sportspeople from Corfu